"Incondicional" is a song by Prince Royce on his album Phase ll and is a mixture of Mexican music and Bachata. It was released on June 12, 2012. At the 2012 Latin Grammy Award ceremony, Royce performed the song live with Mexican singer-songwriter Joan Sebastian.

Music video
Prince Royce did the music video in Mexico City where he is singing to the girl that he is in love with.

Charts

Certifications

See also
List of Billboard number-one Latin songs of 2012

References

2012 singles
Prince Royce songs
Songs written by Prince Royce
Top Stop Music singles
2012 songs
Songs written by Daniel Santacruz